Doto koenneckeri is a species of sea slug, a nudibranch, a marine gastropod mollusc in the family Dotidae.

Distribution
This species was first described from Galway Bay, Ireland. A specimen from Hjeltefiord, Norway is included in the original description, but given the depth and habitat (90- 40 m, Lophelia-reef) this should be treated with scepticism.

Description
This nudibranch is white with brown surface pigment on the back and sides of the body. This pigment is missing along an irregular band connecting the ceratal bases.

EcologyDoto koenneckeri feeds on the hydroid Aglaophenia pluma'', family Aglaopheniidae.

References

Dotidae
Gastropods described in 1976